Aker BP ASA is a Norwegian oil exploration and development company focusing petroleum resources on the Norwegian Continental Shelf. It is present all over Norway. The headquarters are in Fornebu with additional offices in Trondheim, Stavanger and Harstad. The company employs a staff of more than 2,400.

History
Det Norske Oljeselskap (now DNO International) was founded in 1971. Pertra was created when the oil exploration and production division of Petroleum Geo-Services was demerged in 2001.

In 2007, the new Det Norske Oljeselskap was created by merger of a Norwegian oil company Pertra and the Norwegian interests of DNO. In 2009, a Norwegian oil company Aker Exploration merged with Det Norske Oljeselskap. On May 21, 2013, the company announced it had produced its first oil as an operator from the Jette field in the Norwegian sector of the North Sea.

In 2014, Det Norske Oljeselskap bought Marathon Oil's Norwegian subsidiary Marathon Oil Norway for US$2.7 billion. The sale included the Alvheim floating production vessel and 10 active licenses on the Norwegian continental shelf in the North Sea.

In 2016, Det Norske Oljeselskap purchased BP subsidiary BP Norge for US$140 million in cash and US$1.3 billion in stock. The deal left Aker ASA, the industrial investment company controlled by Kjell Inge Rokke, with 40 percent of the merged company's stock, BP with 30 percent, and other public shareholders with the remaining 30 percent. The merger created Norway's largest independent petroleum producer (by volume).

Swedish petroleum company Lundin Energy was purchased by Aker BP in July 2022 in a deal worth more than US$14 billion.

References

Oil companies of Norway
Aker ASA
BP subsidiaries
Companies based in Trondheim
Energy companies established in 1971
Non-renewable resource companies established in 1971
Norwegian companies established in 1971
Companies listed on the Oslo Stock Exchange